Valoissa is the fourth album of the Finnish band Indica and was released in 2008.  It was produced by Tuomas Holopainen.

Track listing 

 "Elä" ("Live") - 3:24
 "Pahinta tänään" ("Worst of Today") - 3:24
 "10 h myöhässä" ("Ten Hours Late") - 3:40
 "Hiljainen maa" ("Quiet Land") - 4:54
 "Askeleet" ("Steps") - 4:04
 "Sanoja" ("Words") - 3:13
 "Valoissa" ("In The Lights") - 4:07
 "Täältä pois" ("Away From Here") - 3:41
 "Pyromaani" ("Pyromaniac") - 3:37
 "Hämärää" ("Murk") - 4:16
 "Ei enää" ("No More") - 6:57

References 

2008 albums
Indica (band) albums